The scientific community examined several approaches to redefining the kilogram before deciding on a redefinition of the SI base units in November 2018. Each approach had advantages and disadvantages.

Prior to the redefinition, the kilogram and several other SI units based on the kilogram were defined by an artificial metal object called the international prototype of the kilogram (IPK). There was broad agreement that the older definition of the kilogram should be replaced.

The International Committee for Weights and Measures (CIPM) approved a redefinition of the SI base units in November 2018 that defines the kilogram by defining the Planck constant to be exactly . This approach effectively defines the kilogram in terms of the second and the metre, and took effect on 20 May 2019.

In 1960, the metre, previously similarly having been defined with reference to a single platinum-iridium bar with two marks on it, was redefined in terms of an invariant physical constant (the wavelength of a particular emission of light emitted by krypton, and later the speed of light) so that the standard can be independently reproduced in different laboratories by following a written specification.  

At the 94th Meeting of the International Committee for Weights and Measures (CIPM) in 2005, it was recommended that the same be done with the kilogram.

In October 2010, the CIPM voted to submit a resolution for consideration at the General Conference on Weights and Measures (CGPM), to "take note of an intention" that the kilogram be defined in terms of the Planck constant,  (which has dimensions of energy times time) together with other physical constants. This resolution was accepted by the 24th conference of the CGPM in October 2011 and further discussed at the 25th conference in 2014. Although the Committee recognised that significant progress had been made, they concluded that the data did not yet appear sufficiently robust to adopt the revised definition, and that work should continue to enable the adoption at the 26th meeting, scheduled for 2018. Such a definition would theoretically permit any apparatus that was capable of delineating the kilogram in terms of the Planck constant to be used as long as it possessed sufficient precision, accuracy and stability. The Kibble balance is one way do this.

As part of this project, a variety of very different technologies and approaches were considered and explored over many years. Some of these approaches were based on equipment and procedures that would have enabled the reproducible production of new, kilogram-mass prototypes on demand using measurement techniques and material properties that are ultimately based on, or traceable to, physical constants. Others were based on devices that measured either the acceleration or weight of hand-tuned kilogram test masses and which expressed their magnitudes in electrical terms via special components that permit traceability to physical constants. Such approaches depend on converting a weight measurement to a mass, and therefore require the precise measurement of the strength of gravity in laboratories. All approaches would have precisely fixed one or more constants of nature at a defined value.

Kibble balance 

The Kibble balance (known as a "watt balance" before 2016) is essentially a single-pan weighing scale that measures the electric power necessary to oppose the weight of a kilogram test mass as it is pulled by Earth's gravity. It is a variation of an ampere balance, with an extra calibration step that eliminates the effect of geometry. The electric potential in the Kibble balance is delineated by a Josephson voltage standard, which allows voltage to be linked to an invariant constant of nature with extremely high precision and stability. Its circuit resistance is calibrated against a quantum Hall effect resistance standard.

The Kibble balance requires extremely precise measurement of the local gravitational acceleration g in the laboratory, using a gravimeter. For instance when the elevation of the centre of the gravimeter differs from that of the nearby test mass in the Kibble balance, the NIST compensates for Earth's gravity gradient of 309μGal per metre, which affects the weight of a one-kilogram test mass by about 316μg/m.

In April 2007, the NIST's implementation of the Kibble balance demonstrated a combined relative standard uncertainty (CRSU) of 36μg. The UK's National Physical Laboratory's Kibble balance demonstrated a CRSU of 70.3μg in 2007. That Kibble balance was disassembled and shipped in 2009 to Canada's Institute for National Measurement Standards (part of the National Research Council), where research and development with the device could continue.

Gravity and the nature of the Kibble balance, which oscillates test masses up and down against the local gravitational acceleration g, are exploited so that mechanical power is compared against electrical power, which is the square of voltage divided by electrical resistance. However, g varies significantly—by nearly 1%—depending on where on the Earth's surface the measurement is made (see Earth's gravity). There are also slight seasonal variations in g at a location due to changes in underground water tables, and larger semimonthly and diurnal changes due to tidal distortions in the Earth's shape caused by the Moon and the Sun. Although g would not be a term in the definition of the kilogram, it would be crucial in the process of measurement of the kilogram when relating energy to power. Accordingly, g must be measured with at least as much precision and accuracy as are the other terms, so measurements of g must also be traceable to fundamental constants of nature. For the most precise work in mass metrology, g is measured using dropping-mass absolute gravimeters that contain an iodine-stabilised helium–neon laser interferometer. The fringe-signal, frequency-sweep output from the interferometer is measured with a rubidium atomic clock. Since this type of dropping-mass gravimeter derives its accuracy and stability from the constancy of the speed of light as well as the innate properties of helium, neon, and rubidium atoms, the 'gravity' term in the delineation of an all-electronic kilogram is also measured in terms of invariants of nature—and with very high precision.

The virtue of electronic realisations like the Kibble balance is that the definition and dissemination of the kilogram no longer depends upon the stability of kilogram prototypes, which must be very carefully handled and stored. It frees physicists from the need to rely on assumptions about the stability of those prototypes. Instead, hand-tuned, close-approximation mass standards can simply be weighed and documented as being equal to one kilogram plus an offset value. With the Kibble balance, while the kilogram is delineated in electrical and gravity terms, all of which are traceable to invariants of nature; it is defined in a manner that is directly traceable to three fundamental constants of nature. The Planck constant defines the kilogram in terms of the second and the metre. By fixing the Planck constant, the definition of the kilogram depends in addition only on the definitions of the second and the metre. The definition of the second depends on a single defined physical constant: the ground state hyperfine splitting frequency of the caesium-133 atom . The metre depends on the second and on an additional defined physical constant: the speed of light . With the kilogram  redefined in this manner, physical objects such as the IPK are no longer part of the definition, but instead become transfer standards.

Scales like the Kibble balance also permit more flexibility in choosing materials with especially desirable properties for mass standards. For instance, Pt10Ir could continue to be used so that the specific gravity of newly produced mass standards would be the same as existing national primary and check standards (≈21.55g/ml). This would reduce the relative uncertainty when making mass comparisons in air. Alternatively, entirely different materials and constructions could be explored with the objective of producing mass standards with greater stability. For instance, osmium-iridium alloys could be investigated if platinum's propensity to absorb hydrogen (due to catalysis of VOCs and hydrocarbon-based cleaning solvents) and atmospheric mercury proved to be sources of instability. Also, vapor-deposited, protective ceramic coatings like nitrides could be investigated for their suitability for chemically isolating these new alloys.

The challenge with Kibble balances is not only in reducing their uncertainty, but also in making them truly practical realisations of the kilogram. Nearly every aspect of Kibble balances and their support equipment requires such extraordinarily precise and accurate, state-of-the-art technology that—unlike a device like an atomic clock—few countries would currently choose to fund their operation. For instance, the NIST's Kibble balance used four resistance standards in 2007, each of which was rotated through the Kibble balance every two to six weeks after being calibrated in a different part of NIST headquarters facility in Gaithersburg, Maryland. It was found that simply moving the resistance standards down the hall to the Kibble balance after calibration altered their values 10ppb (equivalent to 10μg) or more. Present-day technology is insufficient to permit stable operation of Kibble balances between even biannual calibrations. When the new definition takes effect, it is likely there will only be a few—at most—Kibble balances initially operating in the world.

Alternative approaches to redefining the kilogram

Several alternative approaches to redefining the kilogram that were fundamentally different from the Kibble balance were explored to varying degrees, with some abandoned. The Avogadro project, in particular, was important for the 2018 redefinition decision because it provided an accurate measurement of the Planck constant that was consistent with and independent of the Kibble balance method. The alternative approaches included:

Atom-counting approaches

Avogadro project 

 

Another Avogadro constant-based approach, known as the International Avogadro Coordination's Avogadro project, would define and delineate the kilogram as a 93.6mm diameter sphere of silicon atoms. Silicon was chosen because a commercial infrastructure with mature technology for creating defect-free, ultra-pure monocrystalline silicon already exists, the Czochralski process, to service the semiconductor industry. 

To make a practical realisation of the kilogram, a silicon boule (a rod-like, single-crystal ingot) would be produced. Its isotopic composition would be measured with a mass spectrometer to determine its average relative atomic mass. The boule would be cut, ground, and polished into spheres. The size of a select sphere would be measured using optical interferometry to an uncertainty of about 0.3nm on the radius—roughly a single atomic layer. The precise lattice spacing between the atoms in its crystal structure (≈192pm) would be measured using a scanning X-ray interferometer. This permits its atomic spacing to be determined with an uncertainty of only three parts per billion. With the size of the sphere, its average atomic mass, and its atomic spacing known, the required sphere diameter can be calculated with sufficient precision and low uncertainty to enable it to be finish-polished to a target mass of one kilogram.

Experiments are being performed on the Avogadro Project's silicon spheres to determine whether their masses are most stable when stored in a vacuum, a partial vacuum, or ambient pressure. However, no technical means currently exist to prove a long-term stability any better than that of the IPK's, because the most sensitive and accurate measurements of mass are made with dual-pan balances like the BIPM's FB2 flexure-strip balance (see , below). Balances can only compare the mass of a silicon sphere to that of a reference mass. Given the latest understanding of the lack of long-term mass stability with the IPK and its replicas, there is no known, perfectly stable mass artefact to compare against. Single-pan scales, which measure weight relative to an invariant of nature, are not precise to the necessary long-term uncertainty of 10–20 parts per billion. Another issue to be overcome is that silicon oxidises and forms a thin layer (equivalent to  silicon atoms deep) of silicon dioxide (quartz) and silicon monoxide. This layer slightly increases the mass of the sphere, an effect that must be accounted for when polishing the sphere to its finished size.  Oxidation is not an issue with platinum and iridium, both of which are noble metals that are roughly as cathodic as oxygen and therefore don't oxidise unless coaxed to do so in the laboratory. The presence of the thin oxide layer on a silicon-sphere mass prototype places additional restrictions on the procedures that might be suitable to clean it to avoid changing the layer's thickness or oxide stoichiometry.

All silicon-based approaches would fix the Avogadro constant but vary in the details of the definition of the kilogram. One approach would use silicon with all three of its natural isotopes present. About 7.78% of silicon comprises the two heavier isotopes: 29Si and 30Si. This approach could accurately delineate the magnitude of the kilogram because the masses of the three silicon nuclides relative to 12C are known with great precision (relative uncertainties of 1ppb or better). With this approach, the Avogadro constant would not only be fixed, but so too would the atomic mass of 28Si. As such, the definition of the kilogram would be decoupled from 12C and the kilogram would instead be defined as  atoms of 28Si (≈  fixed moles of 28Si atoms). Physicists could elect to define the kilogram in terms of 28Si even when kilogram prototypes are made of natural silicon (all three isotopes present). Even with a kilogram definition based on theoretically pure 28Si, a silicon-sphere prototype made of only nearly pure 28Si would necessarily deviate slightly from the defined number of moles of silicon to compensate for various chemical and isotopic impurities as well as the effect of surface oxides.

Carbon-12 
Though not offering a practical realisation, this definition would precisely define the magnitude of the kilogram in terms of a certain number of carbon12 atoms. Carbon12 (12C) is an isotope of carbon. The mole is currently defined as "the quantity of entities (elementary particles like atoms or molecules) equal to the number of atoms in 12 grams of carbon12". Thus, the current definition of the mole requires that  moles ( mol) of 12C has a mass of precisely one kilogram. The number of atoms in a mole, a quantity known as the Avogadro constant, is experimentally determined, and the current best estimate of its value is  This new definition of the kilogram proposed to fix the Avogadro constant at precisely  with the kilogram being defined as "the mass equal to that of  atoms of 12C".

The accuracy of the measured value of the Avogadro constant is currently limited by the uncertainty in the value of the Planck constant. That relative standard uncertainty has been 50parts per billion (ppb) since 2006. By fixing the Avogadro constant, the practical effect of this proposal would be that the uncertainty in the mass of a 12C atom—and the magnitude of the kilogram—could be no better than the current 50ppb uncertainty in the Planck constant. Under this proposal, the magnitude of the kilogram would be subject to future refinement as improved measurements of the value of the Planck constant become available; electronic realisations of the kilogram would be recalibrated as required. Conversely, an electronic definition of the kilogram (see , below), which would precisely fix the Planck constant, would continue to allow  moles of 12C to have a mass of precisely one kilogram but the number of atoms comprising a mole (the Avogadro constant) would continue to be subject to future refinement.

A variation on a 12C-based definition proposes to define the Avogadro constant as being precisely 3 (≈) atoms. An imaginary realisation of a 12-gram mass prototype would be a cube of 12C atoms measuring precisely  atoms across on a side. With this proposal, the kilogram would be defined as "the mass equal to 3×  atoms of 12C."

Ion accumulation 
Another Avogadro-based approach, ion accumulation, since abandoned, would have defined and delineated the kilogram by precisely creating new metal prototypes on demand. It would have done so by accumulating gold or bismuth ions (atoms stripped of an electron) and counting them by measuring the electric current required to neutralise the ions. Gold (197Au) and bismuth (209Bi) were chosen because they can be safely handled and have the two highest atomic masses among the mononuclidic elements that are stable (gold) or effectively so (bismuth).  See also Table of nuclides.

As with a definition based upon carbon12, the Avogadro constant would also have been fixed. The kilogram would then have been defined as "the mass equal to that of precisely  atoms of gold" (precisely 3,057,443,620,887,933,963,384,315 atoms of gold or about  fixed moles).

In 2003, German experiments with gold at a current of only  demonstrated a relative uncertainty of 1.5%. Follow-on experiments using bismuth ions and a current of 30mA were expected to accumulate a mass of 30g in six days and to have a relative uncertainty of better than 1 ppm. Ultimately, ionaccumulation approaches proved to be unsuitable. Measurements required months and the data proved too erratic for the technique to be considered a viable future replacement to the IPK.

Among the many technical challenges of the ion-deposition apparatus was obtaining a sufficiently high ion current (mass deposition rate) while simultaneously decelerating the ions so they could all deposit onto a target electrode embedded in a balance pan. Experiments with gold showed the ions had to be decelerated to very low energies to avoid sputtering effects—a phenomenon whereby ions that had already been counted ricochet off the target electrode or even dislodged atoms that had already been deposited.

Doing so would have effectively defined the ampere as a flow of  electrons per second past a fixed point in an electric circuit. The SI unit of mass would have been fully defined by having precisely fixed the values of the Avogadro constant and elementary charge, and by exploiting the fact that the atomic masses of bismuth and gold atoms are invariant, universal constants of nature.

Beyond the slowness of making a new mass standard and the poor reproducibility, there were other intrinsic shortcomings to the ionaccumulation approach that proved to be formidable obstacles to ion-accumulation-based techniques becoming a practical realisation. The apparatus necessarily required that the deposition chamber have an integral balance system to enable the convenient calibration of a reasonable quantity of transfer standards relative to any single internal ion-deposited prototype. Furthermore, the mass prototypes produced by ion deposition techniques would have been nothing like the freestanding platinum-iridium prototypes currently in use; they would have been deposited onto—and become part of—an electrode imbedded into one pan of a special balance integrated into the device. Moreover, the ion-deposited mass wouldn't have had a hard, highly polished surface that can be vigorously cleaned like those of current prototypes. Gold, while dense and a noble metal (resistant to oxidation and the formation of other compounds), is extremely soft so an internal gold prototype would have to be kept well isolated and scrupulously clean to avoid contamination and the potential of wear from having to remove the contamination. Bismuth, which is an inexpensive metal used in low-temperature solders, slowly oxidises when exposed to room-temperature air and forms other chemical compounds and so would not have produced stable reference masses unless it was continually maintained in a vacuum or inert atmosphere.

Ampere-based force 

This approach would define the kilogram as "the mass which would be accelerated at precisely  when subjected to the per-metre force between two straight parallel conductors of infinite length, of negligible circular cross section, placed one metre apart in vacuum, through which flow a constant current of  elementary charges per second".

Effectively, this would define the kilogram as a derivative of the ampere rather than the present relationship, which defines the ampere as a derivative of the kilogram. This redefinition of the kilogram would specify elementary charge (e) as precisely  coulomb rather than the current recommended value of  It would necessarily follow that the ampere (one coulomb per second) would also become an electric current of this precise quantity of elementary charges per second passing a given point in an electric circuit.
The virtue of a practical realisation based upon this definition is that unlike the Kibble balance and other scale-based methods, all of which require the careful characterisation of gravity in the laboratory, this method delineates the magnitude of the kilogram directly in the very terms that define the nature of mass: acceleration due to an applied force. Unfortunately, it is extremely difficult to develop a practical realisation based upon accelerating masses. Experiments over a period of years in Japan with a superconducting, 30g mass supported by diamagnetic levitation never achieved an uncertainty better than ten parts per million. Magnetic hysteresis was one of the limiting issues. Other groups performed similar research that used different techniques to levitate the mass.

Notes

References

SI base units
Units of mass